Gromada Rewolucyjna Londyn was a Polish social democratic revolutionary group based in London, England in the late 1850s and early 1860s. It was founded in 1856, and led by the exiles Zenon Świętosławski, Henryk Abicht, Jan Krynski and Ludwik Oborski,  In 1858 they sought to make contact with the wider revolutionaries and international communists and plotted to overthrow the government in Poland, however, this action was thwarted by the Prussian police. Their aims were to abolish private property in Poland and to establish a global socialist republic.

References

Polish revolutionary organisations
Political organisations based in London
1858 in England
Polish-British culture
Polish diaspora organizations
Socialism in England